

Horst Trebes (22 October 1916 – 29 July 1944) was a Hauptmann in the Fallschirmjäger of Nazi Germany during World War II. He was a recipient of the Knight's Cross of the Iron Cross. Trebes participated in the Massacre of Kondomari and the Razing of Kandanos, both war crimes directed by Fallschirmjäger commander Kurt Student. He was killed in action in Normandy on 29 July 1944.

Awards
 Iron Cross (1939)
 2nd Class (13 October 1939)
 1st Class (23 May 1940)
 Knight's Cross of the Iron Cross on 9 July 1941 as Oberleutnant and leader of the III./Fallschirmjäger-Sturm-Regiment

References

Citations

Bibliography

External links

1916 births
1944 deaths
German mass murderers
Luftwaffe personnel killed in World War II
Fallschirmjäger of World War II
Recipients of the Knight's Cross of the Iron Cross
Military personnel from Cologne
Nazi war criminals